Jacob Fischer (born 1967) is a self-taught Danish jazz guitarist. Since 1992 he has been a member of the Svend Asmussen Quartet and founded his own Jacob Fischer Trio, where he plays alongside Hugo Rasmussen on bass and Janus Templeton on drums. He is a member of Christina von Bülow's trio and the Kristian Jørgensens Quartet.

Biography
He had an engagement at the jazz club Jazzhus Montmartre in Copenhagen.

In 1992 he became a member of Svend Asmussen quartet. Since then he has played in numerous ensembles and with Allan Botschinsky, Jesper Thilo, Finn Ziegler, Bob Rockwell, and Radioens Big Band. He formed duos with guitarist Doug Raney and bassists Hugo Rasmussen and Mads Vinding. He has also played with Toots Thielemans, Art Farmer, Lee Konitz, Gary Bartz, John Abercrombie, Scott Hamilton, Adam Nussbaum, Putte Wickman, Jan Allan, and Jerry Bergonzi.

Awards
 1992 JASA-prisen 
 1987 Sørens Penge
 1996 Ben Webster Prize
 1998 Palæbars jazzpris
 DjangodOr
 2003 Jazzpris Silkeborg

Discography
 Playing in the Breeze with Thomas Fryland, Jesper Lundgaard (Music Partner, 1995)
 Fine Together with Anders Lindskog, Jesper Lundgaard (Touche, 1999)
 Over the Rainbow with Mads Vinding (Cope, 2002)
 Jacob Fischer Trio feat. Svend Asmussen, (Gateway, 2008)
 Blues (Gateway, 2010)
 Guitarist (Arbors Records, 2011)
 My Romance ~ tribute to Bill Evans (Venus, 2013)
 ... In New York City  (Arbors Records, 2015)

As sideman
With Chris Potter
This Will Be (Storyville, 2001)

See also
 Danish jazz

External links

References

1967 births
Living people
Danish guitarists
Danish jazz guitarists
Danish jazz musicians
Arbors Records artists
Venus Records artists